The Roodafshan Cave, or Ghar-e Roodafshan, is a solutional cave located in Roodafshan valley, Damavand County, Tehran Province, Iran, in the Alborz mountains. Since 2003 the Verein für Höhlenkunde in Obersteier (Austria) with the Khaneye Koohnavardan-e-Tehran (Iran) has been surveying Roodafshan Cave.

The length of this spacious cave is 1,502 m with a vertical distance of -90.6 m. The Roodafshan Entrance Hall with 168 m length, 94 m width, 40 m high and 11,395 m2 floor area is the second biggest documented cave chamber in Iran.

Further reading
 Geyer, T., & Geyer, E. (2003): Forschungen im Iran, Ghar-e-Roodafshan, - Mitteilungen des Vereins für Höhlenkunde in Obersteier, 22: 42–43.
 Raesi, E., & Laudmanns, M. (2003): Cave Directory Iran, - Berliner Höhlenkundliche Berichte, Band 10. 
 SELAHI, M., (1999): Ghar-haye Iran, Ghar-e-Roodafshan, Page: 51–57. (in Farsi)

References

Caves of Iran
Landforms of Tehran Province